Estadio Independiente MRCI is a football stadium in San Jerónimo Tlacochahuaya, Oaxaca, Mexico.  It is currently used mostly for football matches and is the home stadium of Chapulineros de Oaxaca and Mezcaleros de Oaxaca. The stadium seats 3,000 people.

The stadium has a field of artificial grass, an area of stands, boxes, artificial lighting, dressing rooms, parking, cafeteria and a small sports complex annex, in addition to housing the clubhouse of Chapulineros de Oaxaca.

Since 2019 it is the main field of Chapulineros de Oaxaca, after the club left the field attached to the Estadio Tecnológico de Oaxaca due to schedule problems with other events.

References 

Sports venues in Oaxaca
2018 establishments in Mexico
Football venues in Mexico
Athletics (track and field) venues in Mexico